Hop mosaic virus (HpMV) is a pathogenic plant virus.

External links
ICTVdB - The Universal Virus Database: Hop mosaic virus
Family Groups - The Baltimore Method

Carlaviruses
Viral plant pathogens and diseases
Hop diseases